Eronen is a Finnish surname. Notable people with the surname include:

 Oliver Eronen (1865–1939), Finnish farmer and politician
 Aukusti Eronen (1875–1935), Finnish farmer and politician
 Ella Eronen (1900-1987), Finnish actress
 Tommi Eronen (born 1968), Finnish actor
 Kimmo Eronen (born 1971), Finnish ice hockey player
 Teemu Eronen (born 1990), Finnish ice hockey player
 Elmeri Eronen (born 1995), Finnish ice hockey player

Finnish-language surnames